The 1941-1942 SM-sarja season was cancelled because of the Continuation War.

Liiga seasons
Fin
1941–42 in Finnish ice hockey
Cancelled ice hockey competitions